The İzmir Kentkart is a proximity type smart card used for payment in public transport of İzmir, Turkey. The card was launched on March 15, 1999 and has monthly collector cards. The İzmir Kentkart is a part of the Kentkart project in Turkey launched in 1998.

See also
 Istanbulkart

References

Fare collection systems in Turkey
Transport in İzmir
Contactless smart cards
1999 establishments in Turkey
Rapid transit in Turkey
Ferry transport in Turkey
Public transport in Turkey